STMA may refer to:
 The reporting mark of the St. Maries River Railroad
 St. Michael-Albertville Schools
 St. Michael-Albertville High School